Suarez, Colombia may refer to:
 Suarez, Cauca
 Suárez, Tolima